Thomas Theodor Heine (28 February 1867 – 26 January 1948) was a German painter, illustrator and cartoonist. Born in Leipzig, Heine established himself as a gifted caricaturist at an early age, which led to him studying art at the Kunstakademie Düsseldorf and, briefly, at the Academy of Fine Arts in Munich.

In 1896, he became successful as an illustrator and political cartoonist for the satirical Munich magazine Simplicissimus, for which he appropriated the stylistic idiom of Jugendstil and the graphic qualities of Henri de Toulouse-Lautrec, Aubrey Beardsley and Japanese woodcuts. The illustrated critiques of social orders, and the monarchy in particular, that he made for the magazine led to a six-month prison sentence in 1898. He also began work as a book illustrator in the 1890s.

He fled Germany in 1933, first to Prague. From 1938 until 1942 he lived in Oslo, and from 1942 until his death in 1948 he lived in Stockholm. He published a highly cynical autobiography in 1942 Ich warte auf Wunder.

While I Wait for Miracles claims neither to be autobiographical nor a roman à clef, it was written in 1941 while Hitler was in power in Germany and the Second World War was ongoing. Despite the author's protestations, it is a novel based upon the events of the day, and in particular the events in Munich during the German Revolution of 1918-1919, the Bavarian Soviet Republic, and the rise of National Socialism from 1920 to 1925. Hitler is unfavorably portrayed as the character named "Icarus", a soldier who first mesmerizes Munich audiences in the chapter entitled "The Mass Meeting". It also depicts with less accuracy the 14 September 1921 assault by Hitler on the separatist Otto Ballerstedt, which resulted in Hitler being convicted and sentenced to 100 days in jail.

Gallery

References

External links

 

1867 births
1948 deaths
Academy of Fine Arts, Munich alumni
German illustrators
19th-century German painters
19th-century German male artists
German male painters
20th-century German painters
20th-century German male artists
German prisoners and detainees
Kunstakademie Düsseldorf alumni
Art Nouveau painters
Art Nouveau illustrators
Artists from Leipzig
Refugees in Norway
Jewish emigrants from Nazi Germany to Sweden